is a Japanese fencer. He competed at the 2008 Summer Olympics, but was eliminated in the first round by Paris Inostroza.

References

1982 births
Japanese male épée fencers
Fencers at the 2008 Summer Olympics
Olympic fencers of Japan
Living people
People from Kagoshima Prefecture
Sportspeople from Kagoshima Prefecture
Asian Games medalists in fencing
Fencers at the 2010 Asian Games
Asian Games bronze medalists for Japan
Medalists at the 2010 Asian Games
20th-century Japanese people
21st-century Japanese people